Shishuchi'i' was a Native American village of the Chumash people located in the modern-day county of Santa Barbara, California in the United States.

The village was situated on the Pacific coast, near the current Refugio State Beach.

References

See also
Chumash settlements
Native Americans in California
Native American history of California

 

Former Native American populated places in California
Former populated places in California
Native American populated places
Chumash populated places